Mtito Andei Airport is an airport in Kenya.

Location
The airport,  is located in Makueni County, in the town of Mtito Andei, in southeastern Kenya. The airport lies at the edge  of Tsavo East National Park.

The geographic coordinates of this airport are:2° 42' 0.00"S, 38° 10' 27.00"E (Latitude:-2.700000; Longitude:38.174166).

Overview
Mtito Andei Airport is a small airport that serves the town of Mtito Andei and the adjacent Tsavo National Park.

Airlines and destinations
At the moment there are no regular, scheduled airline services to Mtito Airport.

See also
 Eastern Province (Kenya)
 Kenya Civil Aviation Authority
 List of airports in Kenya

References

External links
  Location of Mtito Andei Airport At Google Maps
  Website of Kenya Airports Authority
  Airkenya Flight Routes

Airports in Kenya
Tsavo National Park
Makueni County
Eastern Province (Kenya)